Odia Muslims are a community of people hailing from the Indian state of Odisha who follow Islam and primarily speak Odia language. They mostly descend from indigenous converts to Islam along with a small proportion that migrated from northern India. They are marked by their distinctive religious practices, food habits and language.

History
It is impossible to state with any certainty when Islam first arrived in Odisha. It is believed that the first significant Islamic presence dates from the invasion of the Bengal general, Kalapahad. Commanding the army of Sultan Sulaiman Khan Karrani, the Sultan of Bengal, Kalapahad defeated Raja Mukund Deva of Cuttack in 1568 CE.

Karrani brought with him Muslim soldiers who settled down in Odisha, however their number was very few. Some early Odia Muslims were converts. However, the number of these Muslims, almost all converts from Hinduism, was statistically insignificant and though they were Muslims by faith, they continued subscribing to the local customs and traditions and retained Odia as their native tongue, as opposed to Persian or Urdu, the then lingua franca of most Indian Muslims. The descendants of these Muslims are still found in the districts of Puri, Khurda and Cuttack, Bhadrak, Jajpur

Later migration continued under Mughal as well as the Nawab of Bengal's rule. The majority of these were traders or clergy, sent to preside over the courts, both secular and Islamic. Post independence, a number of Muslims from other parts of India have made their way to the cities of Rourkela and Bhubaneswar.

Demographics
Islam has had a very slow rate of growth in Odisha even during the Muslim rule as there had never been any major Muslim missionary work. The current population of Muslims in Odisha is 911,670 (2011 census), roughly 2.2% of the total population. The city of Bhadrak has the maximum number of Muslims as a percentage of the total population (about 35%). There is a large population in the cities of Cuttack, Bhubaneswar, Kendrapada and Jajpur. Cuttack, Jajpur and Bhadrak districts also have a substantial rural Muslim population. Isolated Muslim populations exist all along the Odisha coast, primarily in old towns and villages that lie along the main trade routes. Prominent among them are the villages of Brahmabarda, Binjharpur, Alkund, Baruan and Adang in the district of Jajpur. In the interiors, the city of Rourkela has a large number of Urdu speaking Muslims, mostly employed with the Rourkela Steel Plant. They have migrated from the adjoining states of Jharkhand and Bihar. Sambalpur has another important Muslim population. The community has a literacy rate of 71.3%, higher than the national average of 64.9%.

Outside Odisha, Odia Muslims may be found as a part of the Odia diaspora in Delhi, Bangalore and Calcutta. A small proportion of Odia Muslims, largely from the prosperous upper classes of old Cuttack district, migrated to Karachi, Sindh, Pakistan in 1947. Familial ties with relatives in Odisha remained strong till increasing restrictions in the 1980s led to their decline. Outside the South Asia, Odia Muslims are settled in United Arab Emirates, especially in Dubai, and the United States.

Sects
The vast majority of Odia Muslims are Sunni Muslims belonging to the Hanafi school. The Sunnis are divided between the Deobandi and Barelvi sub-schools. There are some sectarian differences and there are often the cause of minor conflict. A small population of Shia Muslims belonging to Twelver Shia Sub-Sect, mainly of Persian descent may be found in Cuttack city. The Ahmadiyya community, considered heretical by Muslims is also has present in very small numbers in Kerang of Khurda District.

Language
A large proportion of Odia Muslims are bilingual and speak both Odia and Urdu. The use of Urdu, the traditional prestige dialect of North Indian Muslims, marks them out from Hindu Odias. Odisha Urdu displays significant variation from the standard dialect. It is marked by many loan words from Odia and has no fixed grammar. For this reason it remains a spoken dialect and is not used in print. Odia or Standard Urdu is preferred on formal occasions. Odia  and Urdu is often used by Muslims of Brahmapur in South Odisha and Odia with Bengali by those in Balasore district. Odia and Urdu are spoken by the Muslims of Western Odisha.

Food
The food habits of Odia Muslims are no different from that of their Hindu neighbours with some minor differences. Seafood features heavily in spite of the Hanafi school's disapproval of shellfish. Meat, both red and white, is widely consumed.

Dress
The traditional sari is preferred by most women. Hijab rules are generally relaxed though the burkha is becoming increasingly common. Men use the lungi, a type of sarong, to cover their lower body unlike the dhoti that is worn by the Hindus.

Culture
Religious observance is generally high among Odia Muslims, though many practices have clearly Hindu roots. Muslim missionary organisations like the Tableeghi Jamaat have sought to counter this admixture.The traditional faith in Dargahs, shrines and other local holy places remains pervasive.

The medieval shrine of Qadam Rasul in Cuttack is one of the most important Muslim dargah in Odisha. It is believed to contain the footprints of the Prophet Muhammad. Important dargahs are at Kaipadar, near Khurda and at Dhamnagar, near Bhadrak. Mughal mosques exist at Cuttack, Jajpur. Niali at Cuttack and near the ancient Buddhist site of Lalitgiri. Capital Mosque at Bhubaneswar is the largest mosque in Odisha.

Education
The Urdu Academy of Odisha, a wing of the Department of Culture, Government of Odisha is engaged in the propagation and popularization of the Urdu language in Odisha. Sayeed Seminary at Cuttack is the oldest and largest Islamic educational institution that provides both secular as well as religious education. At the University Level, Urdu is taught as per certain prescribed syllabus at Fakir Mohan University (FMU), Balasore, Odisha. The  Department of Language and Literature at FMU has Urdu as a key branch of study along with English and Odia. Jamia Ashraful Uloom at Kendrapara town & Jamia Abu Hurairah at Rourkela are the largest madrasa in the state. Markazul Uloom, Sungda established in the 1946 by Maulana Syed Ismail Qasmi of Jamiat Ulema-e-Odisha is a prominent centre of Deobandi Islamic learning in Odisha. Important Barelvi Madrasa are located at Bhadrak.

References

Islam in India by location
Muslim communities of India
Social groups of Odisha
Social groups of Pakistan